|}

Vietnam men's national beach handball team (Vietnamese: Đội tuyển bóng ném bãi biển nam quốc gia Việt Nam) is a national team of Vietnam. It takes part in international beach handball competitions and friendly matches.

Competitions results

World Games
  2001 — Did not enter
  2005 — Did not enter
  2009 — Did not enter
  2013 — Did not enter
  2017 — Did not qualify

World Championship

Asian Championship
  2004 — Did not enter
  2007 — Did not enter
  2011 — Did not enter
  2013 — 5th Place
  2015 — 6th Place
  2017 — 4th Place
  2019 — 4th Place
  2022 —  Bronze medal

Asian Beach Games
  2008 — Did not enter
  2010 —  Did not enter
  2012 — 12th Place
  2014 —  8th Place
  2016 —  4th Place
  2023 — TBD

Southeast Asian Games
  2019 —  Gold medal
  2021 —  Gold medal

Southeast Asian Championship
  2017 —  Gold medal
  2020 — Cancelled

References

External links
IHF profile

National beach handball teams
Beach handball